Władysław Galica (born 20 September 1900 in Chicago – 7 September 1943 in Warsaw, Poland) was a Polish Army Colonel.

Member of the Polish resistance Armia Krajowa (codenames: Bródka, Poręba) during World War II. In 1940 Władysław became commander of the "Kraków area (ZWZ)" and in 1941 Chief-Inspector of the Protection Service of the Uprising (Główny Inspektor Wojskowej Służby Ochrony Powstania). Arrested by the Gestapo in 1943 he was murdered by Germans in Pawiak.

Polish Army officers
Polish resistance members of World War II
Military personnel who died in the Holocaust
1900 births
1943 deaths
People from Chicago
People who died in the Warsaw Ghetto